"Watch Out" by Ferry Corsten is a trance song that was released as a single in 2006, as well as appearing on Ferry Corsten's 2006 album L.E.F.

Chart performance

References 

2006 singles
Trance songs
2006 songs
Songs written by Ferry Corsten
Ultra Music singles